The 2020 Detroit Tigers season was the team's 120th season. This was the team's third and final year under manager Ron Gardenhire, and their 21st at Comerica Park. The start of season was delayed by four months due to the COVID-19 pandemic. The Tigers finished the season with a 23–35 record, ranking last in their division and third-worst in the major leagues, and missed the playoffs for the sixth consecutive season. For the second straight season, the Tigers pitching staff compiled the MLB's worst team ERA (6.37).

The Tigers franchise experienced a major loss on April 6 when Hall of Famer Al Kaline died at the age of 85. Nicknamed "Mr. Tiger," Kaline had been affiliated with the team for 67 years in various roles: first as a player, then as a broadcaster, and most recently, as an executive. The Tigers wore a No. 6 patch this season to honor him.

On September 19, manager Ron Gardenhire announced his retirement from baseball effective immediately, due to recent health concerns including stress, a bout with prostate cancer, and a stomach virus due to food poisoning. Bench coach Lloyd McClendon was named interim manager for the remainder of the season.

Impact of the COVID-19 pandemic

On March 12, 2020, MLB announced that because of the ongoing COVID-19 pandemic, the start of the regular season would be delayed by at least two weeks in addition to the remainder of spring training being cancelled. Four days later, it was announced that the start of the season would be pushed back indefinitely due to the recommendation made by the CDC to restrict events of more than 50 people for eight weeks.

On June 23, commissioner Rob Manfred unilaterally implemented a 60-game season. Players reported to training camps at their regular season home stadiums on July 1 in order to resume spring training, which included only inter-squad games, and prepare for a July 23 or 24 Opening Day. In an effort to slow the spread of the virus, teams only played their own division and the opposite league's corresponding geographical division, e.g. the Tigers only played American League Central (40 games total) and National League Central (20 games total) opponents. Games were played behind closed doors, with artificial crowd noise played over loud speakers.

On June 24, two members of the Tigers organization (later identified as pitcher Daniel Norris and a coach) tested positive for COVID-19. Norris was later cleared to join the Opening Day roster.

The Tigers' August 3–6 series against the St. Louis Cardinals was postponed several times after 17 of the latter's members tested positive for COVID-19. Two of the games were eventually canceled outright.

Roster moves

Coaching staff
On September 30, 2019 the Tigers named Lloyd McClendon as bench coach, Joe Vavra as hitting coach, Dave Clark as first-base coach, and Ramón Santiago as third-base coach. 
On November 12, 2019 Josh Paul was named quality control coach.
On September 19, 2020, the Tigers named bench coach Lloyd McClendon as interim manager replacing Ron Gardenhire who retired.

Releases
On October 24, the Tigers outrighted catcher John Hicks and pitchers Victor Alcántara, Blaine Hardy, and Daniel Stumpf. All four players cleared waivers and elected free agency. On November 26, Hardy signed a minor-league contract with the Minnesota Twins. On January 27, Hicks signed a minor-league contract with the Arizona Diamondbacks.
On November 4, the Tigers granted outfielder Mikie Mahtook free agency. On December 18, he signed a minor-league contract with the Philadelphia Phillies.
On November 25, the Tigers released pitcher Drew VerHagen. He signed a one-year contract with the Hokkaido Nippon-Ham Fighters of Nippon Professional Baseball (NPB).
On December 9, infielder Ronny Rodríguez was claimed off waivers by the Milwaukee Brewers.
On December 11, pitcher Eduardo Jiménez signed a minor-league contract with the Arizona Diamondbacks.
On December 26, pitcher Matt Moore signed with the Fukuoka SoftBank Hawks of Nippon Professional Baseball (NPB).
On January 11, pitcher Ryan Carpenter signed with the Rakuten Monkeys of the Chinese Professional Baseball League (CPBL).
On January 13, pitcher Tyson Ross signed a minor-league contract with the San Francisco Giants.
On January 27, pitcher Austin Adams signed a minor-league contract with the Minnesota Twins.
On February 2, pitcher Edwin Jackson signed a minor-league contract with the Arizona Diamondbacks.
On February 10, infielder Gordon Beckham signed a minor-league contract with the San Diego Padres.
On July 13, the Tigers released pitcher Zack Godley.
On July 21, the Tigers released pitcher Hector Santiago.
On August 6, the Tigers shortstop Jordy Mercer was designated for assignment, he then elected free agency. On August 17 he signed a minor-league contract with the New York Yankees.

Signings
On December 8, the Tigers signed outfielder Jorge Bonifacio to a minor-league contract, with an invitation to spring training.
On December 12, the Tigers claimed pitcher Rony García from the New York Yankees organization in the Rule 5 draft.
On December 13, the Tigers signed catcher Austin Romine to a one-year, $4.15 million contract.
On December 18, the Tigers signed pitcher Shao-Ching Chiang to a minor-league contract.
On December 20, the Tigers signed pitcher Zack Godley to a minor-league contract.
On December 21, the Tigers signed first baseman C. J. Cron and second baseman Jonathan Schoop to one-year, $6.1 million contracts. 
On January 4, the Tigers signed pitcher Alex Wilson to a minor-league contract, with an invitation to spring training. 
On January 6, the Tigers signed pitcher Michael Fulmer to a one-year, $2.8 million contract, avoiding arbitration.
On January 10, the Tigers avoided arbitration when they reached one-year deals with pitchers Matthew Boyd ($5.3 million), Buck Farmer ($1.15 million) and Daniel Norris ($2.962 million), and outfielder JaCoby Jones ($1.575 million).
On January 13, the Tigers signed pitcher Iván Nova to a one-year, $1.5 million contract.
On January 22, the Tigers signed pitcher Hector Santiago to a minor-league contract, with an invitation to spring training.
On January 30, the Tigers signed shortstop Jordy Mercer to a minor-league contract, with an invitation to spring training.
On February 12, the Tigers signed outfielder Cameron Maybin to a one-year, $1.5 million contract which could increase to $2.8 million with bonuses.
On August 31, the Tigers claimed pitcher Dereck Rodríguez off waivers from the San Francisco Giants.

Trades
On November 25, the Tigers acquired pitcher Darío Agrazal from the Pittsburgh Pirates in exchange for cash considerations. He was designated for assignment by the Tigers on January 8.
On January 8, the Tigers acquired catcher Eric Haase from the Cleveland Indians in exchange for cash considerations.
On January 17, the Tigers traded pitcher Matt Hall to the Boston Red Sox in exchange for catcher Jhon Nunez.
On August 31, the Tigers traded  outfielder Cameron Maybin to the Chicago Cubs in exchange for shortstop Zack Short.

Season standings

American League Central

Record against opponents

American League Wild Card

Season highlights

Individual accomplishments

Pitching
On August 2 against the Cincinnati Reds, Tyler Alexander set an MLB record for a reliever by striking out nine consecutive batters. He also tied the Tigers' and American League record of nine consecutive strikeouts set by Doug Fister on September 27, 2012. He became the first pitcher with 10 or more strikeouts in a relief outing since Randy Johnson set the strikeout record for a relief pitcher with 16 on July 18, 2001.
On September 11 against the Chicago White Sox, Casey Mize took a no-hitter into the sixth inning, before a double by Yolmer Sánchez ruined the no-hit bid.
On September 20 against the Cleveland Indians, Matthew Boyd took a perfect game into the fifth inning before Carlos Santana got on base with a single.

Hitting
On August 21 against the Cleveland Indians, Isaac Paredes hit a grand slam for his first major league home run, the first Tiger to do so since Brennan Boesch in 2010.
On August 30 against the Minnesota Twins, Miguel Cabrera recorded his 2,000th hit as a Tiger, becoming the eighth Tiger player to reach the milestone.
On September 6 against the Minnesota Twins, Sergio Alcántara hit a home run in his first at-bat, becoming the eighth Tiger player to accomplish this feat, and the first position player to do since Reggie Sanders in 1974.

Team accomplishments

Hitting
On August 8 against the Pittsburgh Pirates, the Tigers hit four home runs in the first inning for the first time since 1974, and the first time the Tigers hit four home runs in any inning since 2013. This was the first time an MLB team accomplished this since the Kansas City Royals in 2018. The Tigers hit three consecutive home runs in an inning for the first time since 2017.

Other
On August 21, the Tigers ended a franchise-record 20-game losing streak against the Cleveland Indians, winning 10–5. Only one MLB team has had a longer losing streak against another team, that being the Kansas City Royals who lost 23 straight to the Baltimore Orioles between May 10, 1969 and August 2, 1970.

Game log

|- style="background:#fbb;"
| 1 || July 24 || @ Reds || 1–7 || Gray (1–0) || Boyd (0–1) || — || 0–1 || L1
|- style="background:#cfc;"
| 2 || July 25 || @ Reds || 6–4 || Farmer (1–0) || Iglesias (0–1) || Jiménez (1) || 1–1 || W1
|- style="background:#cfc;"
| 3 || July 26 || @ Reds || 3–2 || Cisnero (1–0) || Lorenzen (0–1) || Jiménez (2) || 2–1 || W2
|- style="background:#fbb;"
| 4 || July 27 || Royals || 6–14 || Griffin (1–0) || Funkhouser (0–1) || — || 2–2 || L1
|- style="background:#cfc;"
| 5 || July 28 || Royals || 4–3 || Alexander (1–0) || Zuber (0–1) || Jiménez (3) || 3–2 || W1
|- style="background:#cfc;"
| 6 || July 29 || Royals || 5–4 || Garcia (1–0) || Kennedy (0–1) || Jiménez (4) || 4–2 || W2
|- style="background:#fbb;"
| 7 || July 30 || Royals || 3–5 || Holland (1–0) || Cisnero (1–1) || Rosenthal (1) || 4–3 || L1
|- style="background:#cfc;"
| 8 || July 31 || Reds || 7–2 || Turnbull (1–0) || Castillo (0–1) || — || 5–3 || W1
|-

|- bgcolor="bbbbbb"
| — || August 1 || Reds || colspan="9" | Postponed (inclement weather). Rescheduled to August 2.
|- style="background:#fbb;"
| 9 || August 2 || Reds || 3–4 (7) || Iglesias (1–1) || Jiménez (0–1) || — || 5–4 || L1
|- style="background:#fbb;"
| 10 || August 2 || Reds || 0–4 (7) || Bauer (1–0) || Norris (0–1) || — || 5–5 || L2
|- style="background:#bbb;"
| — || August 3 || Cardinals || colspan="9" | Postponed (Cardinals' COVID-19 outbreak). Rescheduled to September 28.
|- style="background:#bbb;"
| — || August 4 || Cardinals || colspan="9" | Postponed (Cardinals' COVID-19 outbreak). Rescheduled to September 28. 
|- style="background:#bbb;"
| — || August 5 || @ Cardinals || colspan="9" | Postponed (Cardinals' COVID-19 outbreak). Rescheduled to September 10.
|- style="background:#bbb;"
| — || August 6 || @ Cardinals || colspan="9" | Postponed (Cardinals' COVID-19 outbreak). Rescheduled to September 10.
|- style="background:#cfc;"
| 11 || August 7 || @ Pirates || 17–13 (11) || Garcia (2–0) || Neverauskas (0–2) || — || 6–5 || W1
|- style="background:#cfc;"
| 12 || August 8 || @ Pirates || 11–5 || Nova (1–0) || Holland (0–1) || — || 7–5 || W2 
|- style="background:#cfc;"
| 13 || August 9 || @ Pirates || 2–1 || Turnbull (2–0) || Rodríguez (0–1) || Jiménez (5) || 8–5 || W3
|- style="background:#cfc;"
| 14 || August 10 || White Sox || 5–1 || Norris (1–1) || Keuchel (2–2) || — || 9–5 || W4
|- style="background:#fbb;"
| 15 || August 11 || White Sox || 4–8 || Foster (2–0) || Alexander (1–1) || — || 9–6 || L1
|- style="background:#fbb;"
| 16 || August 12 || White Sox || 5–7 || Cease (3–1) || Boyd (0–2) || Colomé (5) || 9–7 || L2
|- style="background:#fbb;"
| 17 || August 14 || Indians || 5–10 || Civale (2–2) || Nova (1–1) || — || 9–8 || L3 
|- style="background:#fbb;"
| 18 || August 15 || Indians || 1–3 || Bieber (4–0) || Turnbull (2–1) || Hand (5) || 9–9 || L4
|- style="background:#fbb;"
| 19 || August 16 || Indians || 5–8 || Pérez (1–0) || Schreiber (0–1) || — || 9–10 || L5
|- style="background:#fbb;"
| 20 || August 17 || @ White Sox || 2–7 || Heuer (1–0) || Boyd (0–3) || — || 9–11 || L6
|- style="background:#fbb;"
| 21 || August 18 || @ White Sox || 4–10 || Cease (4–1) || Skubal (0–1) || — || 9–12 || L7
|- style="background:#fbb;"
| 22 || August 19 || @ White Sox || 3–5 || Marshall (1–1) || Soto (0–1) || Colomé (6) || 9–13 || L8
|- style="background:#fbb;"
| 23 || August 20 || @ White Sox || 0–9 || Giolito (2–2) || Turnbull (2–2) || — || 9–14 || L9
|- style="background:#cfc;"
| 24 || August 21 ||@ Indians || 10–5 || García (1–0) || Plutko (1–2) || — || 10–14 || W1
|- style="background:#fbb;"
| 25 || August 22 ||@ Indians || 1–6 || McKenzie (1–0) || Boyd (0–4) || — || 10–15 || L1
|- style="background:#cfc;"
| 26 || August 23 ||@ Indians || 7–4 || Norris (2–1) || Carrasco (2–3) || – || 11–15 || W1
|- style="background:#fbb;"
| 27 || August 24 || Cubs || 3–9 || Mills (3–2) || Mize (0–1) || — || 11–16 || L1
|- style="background:#cfc;"
| 28 || August 25 || Cubs || 7–1 || Turnbull (3–2) || Chatwood (2–2) || — || 12–16 || W1
|- style="background:#cfc;"
| 29 || August 26 || Cubs || 7–6 || Jiménez (1–1) || Tepera (0–1) || — || 13–16 || W2
|- bgcolor="bbbbbb"
| — || August 27 || Twins || colspan=7 | Postponed (strikes due to shooting of Jacob Blake); Rescheduled to August 28.
|- bgcolor="bbbbbb"
| — || August 28 || Twins || colspan="9" | Postponed (inclement weather). Rescheduled to August 29.
|- bgcolor="bbbbbb"
| — || August 28 || Twins || colspan="9" | Postponed (inclement weather). Rescheduled to September 4 at Target Field.
|- style="background:#cfc;"
| 30 || August 29 || Twins || 8–2 (7) || Boyd (1–4) || Dobnak (5–2) || — || 14–16 || W3
|- style="background:#cfc;"
| 31 || August 29 || Twins || 4–2 (7) || Skubal (1–1) || Duffey (1–1) || Soto (1) || 15–16 || W4
|- style="background:#cfc;"
| 32 || August 30|| Twins || 3–2 || Alexander (2–1) || Maeda (4–1) || Soto (2) || 16–16 || W5
|-

|- style="background:#cfc;"
| 33 || September 1 || @ Brewers || 12–1 || Norris (3–1) || Lindblom (1–3) || — || 17–16 || W6
|- style="background:#fbb;"
| 34 || September 2 || @ Brewers || 5–8 || Yardley (2–0) || Jiménez (1–2) || Hader (9) || 17–17 || L1
|- style="background:#fbb;"
| 35 || September 4 || @ Twins || 0–2 (7) || Dobnak (6–2) || Boyd (1–5) || Rogers (8) || 17–18 || L2
|- style="background:#fbb;"
| 36 || September 4 || @ Twins  || 2–3 (8) || Romo (1–1) || Jiménez (1–3) || May (2) || 17–19 || L3
|- style="background:#fbb;"
| 37 || September 5 || @ Twins || 3–4 || Alcalá (2–1) || Cisnero (1–2) || — || 17–20 || L4
|- style="background:#cfc;"
| 38 || September 6 || @ Twins || 10–8 || Funkhouser (1–1) || Romo (1–2) || Garcia (1) || 18–20 || W1
|- style="background:#fbb;"
| 39 || September 7 || @ Twins || 2–6 || Pineda (1–0) || Fulmer (0–1) || — || 18–21 || L1
|- style="background:#cfc;"
| 40 || September 8 || Brewers || 8–3 || Turnbull (4–2) || Houser (1–4) || — || 19–21 || W1
|- style="background:#fbb;"
| 41 || September 9 || Brewers || 0–19 || Burnes (3–0) || Boyd (1–6) || — || 19–22 || L1
|- style="background:#fbb;"
| 42 || September 10 || @ Cardinals || 2–12 (7) || Flaherty (3–1) || Skubal (1–2) || — || 19–23 || L2
|- style="background:#cfc;"
| 43 || September 10 || @ Cardinals || 6–3 (7) || Cisnero (2–2) || Gallegos (1–2) || Garcia (2) || 20–23 || W1
|- style="background:#fbb;"
| 44 || September 11 || @ White Sox || 3–4 || Marshall (2–1) || Cisnero (2–3) || Colomé (10) || 20–24 || L1
|- style="background:#fbb;"
| 45 || September 12 || @ White Sox || 0–14 || López (1–2) || Fulmer (0–2) || — || 20–25 || L2
|- style="background:#fbb;"
| 46 || September 13 || @ White Sox || 2–5 || Cordero (1–2) || Turnbull (4–3) || Colomé (11) || 20–26 || L3
|- style="background:#cfc;"
| 47 || September 15 || Royals || 6–0 || Boyd (2–6) || Junis (0–2) || — || 21–26 || W1
|- style="background:#fbb;"
| 48 || September 16 || Royals || 0–4 || Singer (3–4) || Skubal (1–3) || — || 21–27 || L1
|- style="background:#fbb;"
| 49 || September 17 || Indians || 3–10 || Bieber (8–1) || Mize (0–2) || — || 21–28 || L2
|- style="background:#fbb;"
| 50 || September 18 || Indians || 0–1 || Plesac (4–2) || Alexander (2–2) || Hand (13) || 21–29 || L3
|- style="background:#cfc;"
| 51 || September 19 || Indians || 5–2 || Cisnero (3–3) || Maton (2–3) || Garcia (3) || 22–29 || W1
|- style="background:#fbb;"
| 52 || September 20 || Indians || 4–7 || Carrasco (3–4) || Boyd (2–7) || — || 22–30 || L1
|- style="background:#fbb;"
| 53 || September 22 || @ Twins || 4–5 (10) || Rogers (2–4) || Garcia (2–1) || — || 22–31 || L2
|- style="background:#fbb;"
| 54 || September 23 || @ Twins || 6–7 || Maeda (6–1) || Mize (0–3) || Romo (5) || 22–32 || L3
|- style="background:#fbb;"
| 55 || September 24 || @ Royals || 7–8 || Hahn (1–0) || Alexander (2–3) || Newberry (1) || 22–33 || L4
|- style="background:#fbb;"
| 56 || September 25 || @ Royals || 2–3 || Keller (5–3) || Turnbull (4–4) || Hahn (2) || 22–34 || L5
|- style="background:#cfc;"
| 57 || September 26 || @ Royals || 4–3 || Boyd (3–7) || Hernández (0–1) || Garcia (4) || 23–34 || W1
|- style="background:#fbb;"
| 58 || September 27 || @ Royals || 1–3 || Singer (4–5) || Skubal (1–4) || Hahn (3) || 23–35 || L1
|-|- bgcolor="bbbbbb"
| 59 || September 28 || Cardinals ||  colspan="9" | Cancelled
|-|- bgcolor="bbbbbb"
| 60 || September 28 || Cardinals ||  colspan="9" | Cancelled
|-

|- style="text-align:center;"
| Legend:       = Win       = Loss       = PostponementBold = Tigers team member

Notes:
  The Tigers were designated the home team for the makeup game from August 28.

Roster

Player stats

Batting

Note: G = Games played; AB = At Bats; R = Runs scored; H = Hits; 2B = Doubles; 3B = Triples; HR = Home runs; RBI = Runs batted in; AVG = Batting average; SB = Stolen bases

+Totals with Tigers only.

Pitching

Starters
Note: W = Wins; L = Losses; ERA = Earned run average; G = Games pitched; GS = Games started; SV = Saves; IP = Innings pitched; R = Runs allowed; ER = Earned runs allowed; BB = Walks allowed; K = Strikeouts

Bullpen

Farm system

See also
COVID-19 pandemic in Michigan
Impact of the COVID-19 pandemic on sports

References

External links
2020 Detroit Tigers Roster and Schedule at Baseball Almanac
2020 Detroit Tigers Statistics at Baseball Reference
Detroit Tigers 2020 Schedule and Stats at MLB.com

Detroit Tigers seasons
Detroit Tigers
Detroit Tigers
2020 in Detroit